Quarter tense (called in all other English speaking countries "ember days") is a uniquely Irish name for those days set aside in the western Christian church for prayer and fasting to sanctify the liturgical seasons. They are of very ancient and uncertain origin, though are generally believed to have originated in Rome. The dates of their celebration are now normally determined by national Roman Catholic hierarchies and not by the universal calendar of the church. The Saturdays of Quarter Tense were considered especially appropriate for priestly ordination. The days of Quarter Tense were, until the Second Vatican Council, time of obligatory fasting and abstinence. However, in Ireland, the obligation of abstinence (the complete avoidance of meat) on the Saturdays of Quarter Tense outside Lent was removed by the Vatican in 1912.

The term "quarter tense" is derived from the official Latin name; "quattuor tempora" ("the four times").
In the Irish language, Quarter Tense is Cátaoir,  Cátaoir na timpire,  Aimsir Chátaoireach, or Laethanta na gCeithre Thráth (lit. "the days of the four times").

The old dates in the Irish calendar for the observation of Quarter Tense were:

The Wednesday, Friday and Saturday following  Ash Wednesday, (liturgical colour - Purple).
The Wednesday, Friday and Saturday after Pentecost Sunday, (liturgical colour - Red).
The Wednesday, Friday and Saturday after September 14- the Feast of the Exaltation of the Holy Cross, (liturgical colour - Purple).
The Wednesday, Friday and Saturday following December 13- Feast of Saint Lucy, (liturgical colour - Purple).

See also
 Christian worship
 Liturgical colours

Catholic holy days
History of Christianity in Ireland